The IIFA Award for Best Film is chosen via a worldwide poll and the winner is announced at the ceremony. UTV Motion Pictures won 3 awards each, followed by Sanjay Leela Bhansali & Yash Chopra with 2 awards each.

Winners and nominees

2010's

2018 (19th)

2019 (20th)

2020's
2020 (21st)

2022 (22nd)

2023 (23rd)

References

External links 
 Official site

International Indian Film Academy Awards
Awards for best film